Macroperipatus perrieri is a species of velvet worm in the Peripatidae family. This species has 28 to 32 pairs of legs. The type locality is in Mexico.

References

Onychophorans of tropical America
Onychophoran species
Animals described in 1899